This list encompasses the honours won by Millwall Football Club and records set by the club, their managers and their players. The record by competition section includes every competitive first team game Millwall have played since their inception in 1885. The cplayer records section includes details of the club's leading goalscorers and those who have made most appearances in first-team competitions, as well transfer records and attendances records.

Player records
Barry Kitchener holds the record for Millwall appearances, having played 596 matches between 1966 and 1982. The goalscoring record is held by Neil Harris, with 138 in all competitions. He broke the previous record of 111 goals, held by Teddy Sheringham on 13 January 2009, during a 3–2 away win at Crewe Alexandra. The club's widest victory margin in the league is 9–1, a scoreline which they achieved twice in their Football League Third Division South championship-winning year of 1927.</ref> They beat both Torquay United and Coventry City by this score at The Den. Millwall's heaviest league defeat was 8–1 away to Plymouth Argyle in 1932. The club's heaviest loss in all competitions was a 9–1 defeat at Aston Villa in an FA Cup fourth-round second-leg in 1946. Millwall's largest Cup win was 7–0 over Gateshead in 1936. Their highest scoring aggregate game was a 12-goal thriller at home to Preston North End in 1930 when Millwall lost 7–5.

Most goals in a season: Richard Parker – 37 League goals (38 in all competitions, Third Division South 1926–27)
Youngest player: Moses Ashikodi – Fifteen years and 240 days. (22 February 2003)

Transfers
Biggest Transfer fee paid: Zian Flemming – £1,700,000 from Fortuna Sittard
Biggest Transfer fee received: George Saville – £8,000,000 to Middlesbrough

Record by competition
This table includes all competitive first team games played throughout Millwall's history in all league and cup competitions. It excludes all pre-season games, friendlies, abandoned matches, testimonials and games played during World War I & II.

Key
The season given as "first" denotes the season in which Millwall first played in the league or cup competition. The season given as "last" denotes the season in which Millwall last played in the league or cup competition. Italicised denotes that Millwall are currently participating in the competition.
P = matches played; W = matches won; D = matches drawn; L = matches lost; F = goals for; A = goals against; +/- = goals against subtracted from goals for; Win% = percentage of total matches won.

Statistics are correct as of 22 July 2020.

a Associate Members' Cup results are included in Football League Trophy results. From 1992 lower league clubs became Full Members of the league, hence the competition being renamed.

League history

Millwall have played in all four divisions during their 94 consecutive seasons as a member of the Football League, including Division Three South. Since the restructuring of the Football League with a national four-tier system, Millwall's lowest league finish is ninth in the founding season of the Fourth Division in 1958–59. The highest league finish is 10th in the First Division of the 1988–89 season. As of the 2020–21 season, Millwall has spent 94 consecutive seasons in the Football League.

Seasons spent at Level 1 of the football league system: 2
Seasons spent at Level 2 of the football league system: 44
Seasons spent at Level 3 of the football league system: 43
Seasons spent at Level 4 of the football league system: 5

Record results

Wins 

League:

9–1 v Torquay United (Third Division South, 29 August 1927)
9–1 v Coventry City (Third Division South, 19 November 1927)

FA Cup:
7–0 v Gateshead (12 December 1936)

Losses 
League:

1–8 v Plymouth Argyle (Division Two, 16 January 1932)

FA Cup:

1–9 v Aston Villa (28 January 1946)

Honours

Attendances

Record home attendance
Their 1937 appearance in the FA Cup was distinguished by the fact they became the first team in the old third division to reach the semi-finals, knocking out three First Division sides on the way, including Derby County who were defeated 2–1 in front of Millwall's official record crowd of 48,762 on 20 February 1937, with hundreds more locked out. The commentator described the crowd surging and swaying like a "wheatfield in the wind."

Millwall are also famous for officially being the 'best supported club' to have played at the old Wembley Stadium.
In the 1999 Autowindscreen Shield Final v Wigan Athletic, Millwall had an estimated 48,000 fans supporting them.
In the 2008/2009 season Millwall qualified for the League 1 Play Off Final after beating Leeds United over two legs. Drawn against Scunthorpe United, who only brought around 10,000 supporters, Millwall fans were in the majority with around 45,000. This is the best attendance for a domestic team at the new Wembley.

Average home attendances

Millwall have spent 93 seasons in the Football League (1920–21 to 2019–20), and in that time have averaged an attendance of approximately 12,000, with 25 of those years being played at the current Den and the rest at the Old Den. Just before World War II Millwall averaged their highest attendance of 27,373 and were the tenth best supported club in the country. After the war they continued to attract 20,000+ gates, but the team's fortunes on the pitch began to change for the worse. In the 1950s attendances began to dwindle as the decade drew to a close. Throughout the 1980s Millwall struggled to pull in crowds after home games were made all-ticket after crowd trouble against Leeds United. Often averaging around 4,500 for a season, the club was pushed to the edge of financial extinction. After watching the team struggle for years, promotion to the top flight in 1988 brought supporters back, games are no longer all-ticket and averages since have been just under 10,000.

Personnel honours

English Football Hall of Fame 
Millwall players inducted into the English Football Hall of Fame:

 Teddy Sheringham (2009)
 Ray Wilkins (2013)

PFA Fans' Player of the Year 

Players included in the PFA Fans' Player of the Year whilst playing for Millwall:
 Jay Simpson (2008, while on loan from Arsenal) (First winner of the award whilst on loan at another club.)

PFA Team of the Year 
Players included in the PFA Team of the Year whilst playing for Millwall:

 Tim Cahill (2004)
 Tim Cahill (2001)
 Matt Lawrence (2001)
 Neil Harris (2001)
 Alex Rae (1996)
 Alex Rae (1995)
 Ben Thatcher (1995)
 Colin Cooper (1993)
 Dave Cusack (1985)
 John Jackson (1980)
 Ray Evans (1976)
 Bryan King (1975)
 Bryan King (1974)

Football records in England
These are records held by Millwall throughout the whole of England.

Most home league goals scored in a season: 87 (Third Division South, 1927–28)

Consecutive clean sheets: 11 (Third Division South, 1925–26) (held jointly with York City and Reading)
Youngest FA Cup finalist: Curtis Weston, 17 years and 119 days

References

Bibliography

External links
Official site

Millwall
Records and Statistics